Jorge Luis Nieves Parra (born May 23, 1952) is a former Uruguayan football referee who supervised the 1993 and the 1997 Copa América.

External links
 Jorge Nieves at WorldFootball.net
 

1952 births
Living people
Uruguayan football referees
Copa América referees
Place of birth missing (living people)
20th-century Uruguayan people